Aliabad-e Sadat (also Romanized as ‘Alīābād-e Sādāt; also known as ‘Alīābād) is a village in Koshkuiyeh Rural District, Koshkuiyeh District, Rafsanjan County, Kerman Province, Iran. At the 2006 census, its population was 358, in 84 families.

References 

Populated places in Rafsanjan County